Yelena Igorevna Zakharova (born 2 November 1975) is a Russian theater and film actress.

Biography 
Yelena Zakharova was born in Moscow, they lived near the park Sokolniki. Then Yelena mother gave her in classical ballet, but there she has studied very little. With a career in classical ballet did not happen. At school, she loved the Russian language, literature and foreign languages. At school, she dreamed of becoming a model. At school I started acting in movies.

In the course of the Boris Shchukin School he played the role in the film Vicky Alexander Alexandrov "Shelter comedians". After graduating from college in 1998, he admitted to the Moon Theatre under the direction of Sergei Prokhanov.

In 2005, Helen took part in the reality show "Empire", which, according to her, has learned to light the stove, spinning wool, and milk the cow. She especially liked the role in the series "Kadetstvo", and the fact that it approved without trial for the role of Polina Sergeyevna.

Personal life 
Yelena in a relationship with businessman Sergei Mamontov (b. 1968) since June 2009. Their only child, a daughter Maria-Anna Mamontova, was born on 4 February 2011 and died 8 months later from complications of grippe.

Selected filmography

References

External links 

 

1975 births
Living people
Russian film actresses
Russian television actresses
Russian stage actresses